William Douglas Slade (27 September 1941 – 22 December 2019) was a Welsh cricketer. Slade was a right-handed batsman who bowled right-arm medium pace. He was born at Briton Ferry, Glamorgan.

First-class career
Slade made his first-class debut for Glamorgan in the 1961 County Championship against Hampshire at St. Helen's, Swansea. In his first season, he made a further thirteen first-class appearances, scoring 370 runs at an average of 17.61, while recording his maiden half century against Leicestershire. However, in the following season he made just six first-class appearances, with Slade struggling to break into Glamorgan's first eleven over the following three seasons, making eight first-class appearances in 1963, seven in 1964 and eight in 1965. It was in 1963 that he made his List A debut against Somerset in the first-round of the Gillette Cup. Glamorgan progressed to the quarter-finals of the tournament, with Slade playing in Glamorgan's quarter-final defeat to Worcestershire.

In 1966, Slade appeared in fourteen first-class matches, twelve of which came in that seasons County Championship. He scored a total of 338 runs in this season, at a low average of 13.52, as well as passing fifty just once against Sussex. He also made a single List A appearance in the 1966 Gillette Cup in a second-round defeat by Warwickshire. The 1967 season was to be his last in first-class cricket, with Slade making ten appearances, the last of which came against Middlesex. In his final season, he scored a total of 273 runs at an average of 15.16, with a high score of 42. He also made a single List A appearance in a 1967 Gillette Cup second-round defeat to Hampshire at the United Services Recreation Ground, Portsmouth. Throughout his time at Glamorgan, Slade had been unable to command a regular place in Glamorgan's starting eleven. He played a total of 67 first-class matches for the county, scoring 1,482 runs at an average of 14.11, with a high score of 73 not out against Derbyshire in 1963. He was part of the Glamorgan team which beat the Australians in 1964, just their second defeat to a county since 1912, Slade taking two close catches.

Slade was an exceptional fielder close to the wicket, usually at short leg. Don Shepherd said he had “fantastic hands”. In 67 matches, he took 100 catches. He was also occasionally utilised as an off-spin bowler, taking 32 wickets at a bowling average of 46.65, with best figures of 4/144. He also played in four List A matches, scoring 52 runs at an average of 13.00, with a high score of 28.

International career 
He later captained Wales in the 1979 ICC Trophy, captaining the team in three matches against the Netherlands, Israel and the United States. Wales failed to progress from their group in the tournament, although they were not eligible for qualification for the 1979 World Cup even if they had won the event. He also coached cricket at Marlborough College, and in a number of other schools and clubs. He also ran a pub in the Vale of Neath. He suffered from dementia in his later years.

References

External links
Billy Slade at ESPNcricinfo
Billy Slade at CricketArchive

1941 births
2019 deaths
Cricketers from Briton Ferry
Welsh cricketers
Glamorgan cricketers
Welsh cricket captains
Welsh cricket coaches